Anti-Obesity Day (AOD) is observed in various parts of the world on November 26, with several healthcare organizations and leading Media primarily in India and the Gulf Cooperation Council (GCC) countries marking the day with activities to highlight how obesity is a public health hazard. 

In 2001, the Indian Wellness brand VLCC, founded by Mrs. Vandana Luthra, took the first step towards creating awareness about Obesity and its ill-effects through the creation of an anti-obesity initiative to address the global pandemic.

With the active involvement of the medical fraternity and other key stakeholders in all the countries where it has a presence, VLCC started observing November 26 as Anti-Obesity Day, as part of an annual campaign conducted in the months of November and December to promote the development of good lifestyle habits to stay healthy and fit.

VLCC’s anti-obesity campaign includes organizing health camps, mass counseling sessions, and talk-shows with health experts, besides extensive media interactions, and dissemination of special literature on obesity.

VLCC’s Anti-Obesity Day™ initiative has received wide coverage in the Media with articles on this appearing on this in several key mainstream and specialized media in India and the GCC countries, which include publications such as The Times of India, The Hindu, Muscat Daily etc.

In 2012, VLCC had tied up with the United Nations’ World Food Programme (WFP), to launch the nutrition availability imbalance awareness building initiative - the "Global Balance Program" - the public communication campaign which has been recognized as one of the best Corporate Social Responsibility awareness building campaigns in the world by the World Economic Forum (WEF).

According to the World Health Organization (WHO), Overweight and Obesity pose the fifth leading risk for global deaths. A person whose Body Mass Index (BMI) – the individual’s weight in kilograms divided by the square of his height in meters – is greater than or equal to 25 is Overweight. A person whose BMI is greater than or equal to 30 is considered Obese.

The WHO states that at least 2.8 million adults die every year on account of being overweight or obese. In addition, 44% of diabetes cases, 23% of ischaemic heart diseases and 7-41% of certain instances of cancer are attributable to overweight and obesity.

The WHO points out that the incidence of obesity worldwide has nearly doubled since 1980 and that 65% of the world’s population now lives in countries where more deaths are attributable to overweight and obesity than being underweight. In 2008, more than 1.4 billion adults aged 20 and above were overweight. Of these, more than 200 million men and nearly 300 million women were obese. More than 40 million children under the age of five were overweight in 2011.

Some facts on world anti obesity day on Times of India & NDTV.

References

Obesity
Health awareness days
November observances